Froy or FRoY may refer to:

States
Federal Republic of Yugoslavia, the name of Serbia and Montenegro from 1992 to 2003

People
 Frøy Aagre (born 1977), Norwegian musician
 Herald Froy, pen-name of Keith Waterhouse (and Guy Deghy)
 Martin Froy (1926-2017), British painter
 Miss Froy, a fictional character in the book The Wheel Spins and the film The Lady Vanishes
 Froy Gutierrez American actor and singer
 Froy Salinas (1939-2021), American politician

Other uses
 Team Frøy–Bianchi, UCI Continental cycling team